Bullitt County Public Schools is a school district serving students residing in Bullitt County, Kentucky.  Cities served by district include Shepherdsville, Lebanon Junction, Mount Washington, and some small sections of Bullitt County with a Louisville postal address.  This district is one of the largest in the state.

The district serves all of the county except for parts in Fort Knox, which are served by the Department of Defense Education Activity (DoDEA).

Schools

Elementary schools
Brooks Elementary School
Cedar Grove Elementary School
Crossroads Elementary School 
Freedom Elementary School
Lebanon Junction Elementary School
Maryville Elementary School
Mount Washington Elementary
Nichols Elementary School
Old Mill Elementary School
Overdale Elementary School
Pleasant Grove Elementary School
Roby Elementary School
Shepherdsville Elementary School

Middle schools
Bernheim Middle School
Bullitt Lick Middle School
Eastside Middle School
Hebron Middle School
Mount Washington Middle School
Zoneton Middle School
Shepherdsville Middle School (Formed in 1980, closed early 1990s)

High schools
Bullitt Central High School, located in Shepherdsville
Bullitt East High School, located in Mount Washington
North Bullitt High School, located in Hebron Estates (served by the Shepherdsville post office)
 Riverview Opportunity Center, located in Shepherdsville

Additional programs
Adult Education School
Day Treatment High School

References

External links
Bullitt County Public Schools

School districts in Kentucky
Education in Bullitt County, Kentucky